Kanti may refer to:
 Kanti, Muzaffarpur, a town in Muzaffarpur district, Bihar, India
Kanti railway station
 Kanti (film), a 2004 Kannada-language romance- drama film